Alopecurus saccatus is a species of grass known by the common name Pacific foxtail, or Pacific meadow foxtail.

It is native the west coast of the United States from Washington to California, where it grows in moist areas at low elevations.

Description
Alopecurus saccatus is an annual bunchgrass, forming tufts of stout, erect stems up to about 45 centimeters in maximum height. Leaves are up to 12 or 13 centimeters long.

The inflorescence is a dense panicle up to 6 or 7 centimeters long which blooms in yellow to reddish brown anthers.

References

External links
Calflora Database: Alopecurus saccatus (Pacific foxtail)
Jepson Manual eFlora (TJM2) treatment of Alopecurus saccatus
USDA Plants Profile for Alopecurus saccatus (Pacific foxtail)
Grass Manual Treatment
UC Photos gallery — Alopecurus saccatus

saccatus
Bunchgrasses of North America
Grasses of the United States
Native grasses of California
Flora of Idaho
Flora of Oregon
Flora of Washington (state)
Flora of the Cascade Range
Flora of the Sierra Nevada (United States)
Natural history of the California chaparral and woodlands
Natural history of the Central Valley (California)
Natural history of the San Francisco Bay Area